Bar Elias (also transliterated Barelias, Barr Elias or Bar Ilyas) is a town located in the Zahlé District, Bekaa Governorate, Lebanon. With around 40,000 inhabitants, mostly Sunni Muslims, it is the second largest town, after Zahlé, in the Zahlé District. Bar Elias is a village of the Bekaa Valley, the center of Bekaa. It is known widely by its transit passes, as it is halfway between Beirut and Damascus.

As the distance between the center of the northern Bekaa and the south became important because of its central valleys and on the international line of the most important economic centers and the largest commercial markets, Bar Elias has good neighborly relations with the rest of the towns and villages in the province. Easily accessible from all directions and in the center of the Bekaa Valley, Bar Elias is an open gate to all guests and visitors.

Bar Elias is 900 m above sea level, at a distance of 51 km from Beirut via Damascus-Chtoura. It is spread over both sides of the international line between Beirut and Damascus over the exterior 4 km. A lovely green plain extends across distances up to Anjar to the east, Zahlé to the west, Kafr Zabad and Addalhamiah to the north, and Almarj to the south.

It consists of a vast land area of about 35000 dunums (3500 hectares), of which about 7000 dunums is residential and the rest agricultural.

History
In 1838, Eli Smith noted Burr Elyas as a Sunni Muslim, Greek Catholic and Maronite village in the Beqaa Valley.

Geography
It is possible to drive a car from Bar Elias to Beirut in 60 to 75 minutes, depending on traffic volume.

Climate 
Bar Elias is located in the East of Lebanon. Its weather is known for its dryness. It rarely rains in Bar Elias in the summer, there is indeed a lack of humidity. The summers are very warm, with temperatures reaching 35 degrees Celsius. The winters are rather cold, also characterized by heavy snows. The rivers "Litani and Ghzayil" flow just around the outskirts of the town.

Population 
Bar Elias' population has steadily grown since its founding. At the end of the eighteenth century, Bar Elias had less than a thousand inhabitants and 50 houses. By the late 1850s, the population jumped to about 7-10,000 people. The population continued to grow throughout the twentieth century. Today, Bar Elias is home to about 60-80,000 Lebanese.

Bar Elias is the largest Sunni town in much of the Bekaa Valley. 15-20% of the city is Christian, which is fair as Zahlé province, where Bar Elias is located in, has a Christian majority. Like the Christians in Zahlé which are a majority Greek Catholic, the Christians of Bar Elias are Catholic Christianity 90% and Maronite Christianity 10%. There used to be a number of Druze living in Bar Elias, but their number declined because of communal tensions. During the Civil War, Bar Elias's Christians were kept safe from any outsiders by the Muslims of the town, however it is well known Bar Elias was the only town to stand up with Zahlé and the Phalanges ... a reputation well known in the Bekaa to date.

Agriculture and Commerce 
Bar Elias is situated at the heart of Lebanese agriculture, the Bekaa which is known for its numerous vast plains. Most of the people of Bar Elias gain there living and sustenance through these plains. The people of Bar Elias primarily cultivate wheat fields, barley, beets, onions, apples, potatoes, garlic plantations, and walnut groves. During the civil war, the agriculture in Bar Elias, like much of the province, did not fare so well. Syria closed off a good deal of fields, transforming them into military areas. In the past Bar Elias knew large commercial success, which was mainly due to the town's location. Bar Elias is located on the passageway connecting Damascus to Beirut. As such, it holds an important commercial position.

Some of the largest companies in Bar Elias include: Al Mossawi Retail, Abdul Ghani (Hammadeh) For Power Generators and Agriculture Equipment; Mais Super Market, Jamil Sayed co., Jamil Sayed Srl, Abou Hassan Housewares, Hammoud Trading, bayrouti, Al sultan, Aboujokh Electrics, Salloum Trading, Salloum servicing Garage.

Facilities 
Like neighboring towns and villages, Bar Elias boasts many restaurants, primarily on the Ghzayyil River, which flows on the outskirts of the town. Fisheries, restaurants, and a nice enjoyable day on the river accompanied by music and good food is what it's all about. Nonetheless it also has medical and educational facilities, with about eight schools varying from public to private ones, Bar Elias is in the lead educationally among other Bekaa towns. Moreover, it is also medically advanced for having a hospital and a medical center. The hospital is managed by a Palestinian administration and it is mainly for Palestinian refugees, while the medical center is managed by the Bar Elias municipality generally, and by a changing members of the municipality.

Religion 
Bar Elias is predominantly Sunni Muslim, however there are a number of Christians who live in the town. Religion is important in Bar Elias, like much of Lebanon. There are more than four mosques in the town, and two churches. The Mufti El Mais, a prominent Sunni religious leader associated with Future Movement, is from Bar Elias.

Politics

Government 
The municipality of Bar Elias is located in the district of Zahlé, one of the eight districts in Lebanon. Free elections produced a Municipality council of 18 members representing most of the families in the town. 56% of the population voted in the last council election.

Bar Elias in Lebanese Politics 
Bar Elias houses many political parties and political families. Since 1992 - date of the first elections after the end of the war - all the elected Sunni Muslims deputies for Zahlé district were originally from Bar Elias: Ali Maita (lawyer), Dr. Mohamad al Mais and Dr. Assem Araji. Bar Elias' population live coherently and were never involved in local battles and are not affected by the sectarian atmosphere that overwhelmed the country. Co-habitation in the town represents a good practice for the country to learn from. This refers to the strong ties between the families - Muslims and Christians - who lived for hundreds of years as a big family.

References

Bibliography

External links
 Barelias.net
 Barr Elias, localiban

Populated places in Zahlé District
Sunni Muslim communities in Lebanon